Suraram may refer to:

Suraram, Ranga Reddy district, a colony in Ranga Reddy district, Telangana, India
Suraram, Nalgonda district, a village in Nalgonda district, Telangana, India